James P. Boyd (March 1826 – 1890) was an Ontario businessman and political figure. He represented Prescott in the Legislative Assembly of Ontario as a Liberal member from 1867 to 1871.

He was born in Limerick, Ireland in 1826 and came to Canada West in 1847, settling at Vankleek Hill. He married Adelia Caroline Wells there. Boyd was a timber merchant and sawmill owner. He also owned a gristmill, carding mill and general store. He served as a reeve of West Hawkesbury Township. He was also a minister of the Congregational Church of London, Ontario. Boyd defeated Thomas D'Arcy McGee for the seat in the provincial assembly in 1867. In 1874, he ran unsuccessfully for the same seat in the House of Commons. In 1878, he was forced to sell his mills after encountering financial difficulties.

References 
 The story of Vankleek Hill : and the surrounding area, AD MacKinnon (1979)

External links 
The Canadian parliamentary companion HJ Morgan (1869)

1826 births
1890 deaths
Irish emigrants to pre-Confederation Ontario
Ontario Liberal Party MPPs
19th-century Congregationalist ministers
Canadian food industry businesspeople
19th-century American businesspeople
Businesspeople from Ontario
Canadian Congregationalist ministers
Immigrants to the Province of Canada